Valentia Island is one of Ireland's most westerly points. It lies off the Iveragh Peninsula in the southwest of County Kerry. It is linked to the mainland by the Maurice O'Neill Memorial Bridge at Portmagee. A car ferry also departs from Reenard Point to Knightstown, the island's main settlement, from April to October. Another, smaller village named Chapeltown sits at roughly the midpoint of the island,  from the bridge. Valentia Island's permanent population is 665.

Name
The English name 'Valentia' or 'Valencia' Island does not come from the Spanish city of Valencia. Instead it comes from the Irish name of Valentia Harbour, cuan Bhéil Inse, "harbour-mouth of the island". It was anglicized as 'Bealinche' and 'Ballentia' before evolving into 'Valentia'. It is possible the spelling was influenced by Spanish sailors; there is a grave marker to Spanish sailors lost at sea in the Catholic cemetery at Kylemore

The Irish name for the island is Dairbhre, probably meaning "oak isle". It was historically anglicized as 'Dariry'.

History

Valentia was the eastern terminus of the first commercially viable transatlantic telegraph cable. The first attempt in 1857 to land a cable from Ballycarbery Strand on the mainland just east of Valentia Island ended in disappointment. After subsequent failures of cables landed at Knightstown in 1858 and Foilhommerum Bay in 1865, the vast endeavor finally resulted in commercially viable transatlantic telegraph communications from Foilhommerum Bay to Heart's Content, Newfoundland in 1866. Transatlantic telegraph cables operated from Valentia Island for one hundred years, ending with Western Union International terminating its cable operations in 1966.

Before the transatlantic telegraph, American longitude measurements had a  uncertainty with respect to European longitudes. Because of the importance of accurate longitudes to safe navigation, the U.S. Coast Survey mounted a longitude expedition in 1866 to link longitudes in the United States accurately to the Royal Observatory in Greenwich.  Benjamin Gould and his partner A. T. Mosman reached Valentia on 2 October 1866. They built a temporary longitude observatory beside the Foilhommerum Cable Station to support synchronized longitude observations with Heart's Content, Newfoundland.  After many rainy and cloudy days, the first transatlantic longitude signals were exchanged between Foilhommerum and Heart's Content on 24 October 1866.

On 21 May 1927, Charles A. Lindbergh made his first landfall in Europe over Dingle Bay and Valentia Island on his solo flight from New York to Paris. On the 1927 Mercator chart used by the famous pilot, it was labeled Valencia.

In 1993 an undergraduate geology student discovered fossilised tetrapod trackways, footprints preserved in Devonian rocks, on the north coast of the island at Dohilla. About 385 million years ago, a primitive vertebrate passed near a river margin in the sub-equatorial river basin that is now southwestern Ireland and left prints in the damp sand. The prints were preserved by silt and sand overlying them, and were converted to rock over geological time. The Valentia Island trackways are among the oldest signs of vertebrate life on land.

On 14 March 2021, Valentia Island was the site of the first walrus sighting in Ireland.

Places of interest

The combined features and history of the island make it an attractive tourist destination, easily accessible from the popular Ring of Kerry route.
On the northeast of the island stands Glanleam House amid sub-tropical gardens. Protected by windbreaks from Atlantic gales and never touched by frost, these gardens provide the mildest microclimate in Ireland. Starting in the 1830s, Sir Peter George Fitzgerald, the 19th Knight of Kerry (1808–1880), planted these gardens and stocked them with a unique collection of rare and tender plants from the southern hemisphere, normally grown under glass in Ireland. The gardens are laid out in a naturalistic style as a series of walks. There are plants from South America, Australia, New Zealand (the tallest tree ferns in Europe), Chile and Japan. The gardens are memorialized in a selected golden-variegated Luma apiculata "Glanleam Gold" that originated as a sport in the garden. The gardens are open to the public.
The slate quarry which reopened in 1998 provided slates for the British Houses of Parliament.
The island also hosts a heritage centre which tells the story of the geology, human, natural and industrial history of the island, with exhibits on the Cable Station, the Marine Radio Station and the RNLI's Valentia Lifeboat Station.
The Telegraph Field (or Longitude Field) is the site of the first permanent communications link between Europe and North America Transatlantic telegraph cables operated from Valentia Island from 1866.

Gallery

Climate
Valentia Island has an oceanic climate (Cfb). Valentia Island is, on average, the wettest weather station in Ireland. Valentia Island sits on the eastern edge of the Atlantic Ocean. Despite it being on the same latitude as St. Anthony in Newfoundland on the opposite side of the Atlantic Ocean, it enjoys much milder winters thanks to the moderating effect of prevailing west or south west winds, and the effects of the warming Gulf Stream current. Snow and frost are rare, and because of this the island can support many sub-tropical varieties of plants.

Sport
Valentia Young Islanders GAA is the local Gaelic Athletic Association club.

Valentia is a popular fishing location, and Valentia waters hold the Irish records for conger eel, red sea bream, Ray's bream and lesser spotted dogfish.

Notable people
 Helen Blackburn who was a leading women's rights campaigner in England was born here in 1842.
 Valentia was considered home to Mug Ruith, a powerful blind druid in Irish mythology.
 The O'Sullivans, headed by the O'Sullivan Beare, owned much of Valentia until the 17th century.
 The noted naturalist Maude Jane Delap lived and worked in Knightstown, carrying out important research into the marine life surrounding Valentia and identifying many new species.
 Valentia is the home of former Gaelic footballer Mick O'Connell, and the birthplace of John J "Sceilg" O'Kelly, leader of Sinn Féin from 1926.
 Gaelic footballer Ger O'Driscoll was born on Valentia Island.
 The American solo rock climber Michael Reardon died on 13 July 2007 at the Fogher Cliffs of Valentia Island when he was swept out to sea following a successful climb.
 Gerald Spring Rice, 6th Baron Monteagle of Brandon was brought up on the island, as were many other members of the Spring Rice family.

See also

 List of RNLI stations

References

External links
Valentia Island Portal
Valentia Heritage Centre
Valentia Island Annual Music Festival
Travel Information
The Tetrapod Trackways
The Laying of the Atlantic Telegraph Cable
Telegraph Cable History Trail
Cable History at the Valentia Heritage Centre
Alan Hall - Sculptor of the First Transatlantic Cable and First message sent to USA 1856 Memorial  
Submarine Telegraphs, Their History, Construction, and Working by Charles Bright
Linking European and American Longitude
IEEE History Center: County Kerry Transatlantic Cable Stations, 1866
The Transatlantic Longitude as Determined by the Coast Survey Expedition of 1866
Valentia Island Sea Angling
The Telegraph Field - Valentia Island
Irelandbyways site Valentia Information
Valentia Island

Further reading
 Browne, E.T., The fauna and flora of Valencia Harbour on the west coast of Ireland. Proc. R.Ir. Acad., ser.3,5, 667-854

Islands of County Kerry
Fossil trackways